Ahmed Ragab Seada a human rights activist, a labor leader in the petroleum sector, and occupies the Executive Director of the National Organization of modern human rights and human development in Egypt.

January 25 revolution

Last week saw before stepping down a wave of strikes and economic demands spread like wildfire, carrier revolution main demand the fall of Mubarak. On Tuesday, February 8, after the announcement of Suez port workers strike While what was needed reforms besieging Parliament and the Council of Ministers, led by Ahmed Seada more than 4,000 oil workers strike, demanding higher wages and labor guarantees. They were joined by a rapid public transport workers and textile workers and staff and health workers. By Thursday February 10 were strikes have spread from Alexandria to Aswan. And encourages strikers uprising of the masses, raising new economic demands, which has long fought for. They went so far as through direct confrontation of a dictatorship, demanding the fall of the regime.

Petroleum workers after the revolution

"Decades pass without something happen, and there are weeks in which he talked contracts" 
This was the case for tens of years in the petroleum sector, the absence of equality was the theme obvious but Seada exploited uprising workers initiated with workers Petrotrade on February 6, 2011 and distributed data urges wider participation of the workers, causing workers Epsco then workers Botajmasco then workers Syanko to strikers to impose their demands on officials petroleum sector who have tried several ways to circumvent and circumvent their demands, entered sector leaders and officials from the state and the military junta in multiple meetings with Ahmed Saada to find compromises, but triumphed strike after picket lasted for twenty-one days, where workers earn an increase in wages by 375%, to be the biggest victory for the workers' picket in the history of the labor movement in Egypt

Post-Mubarak 
After the revolution, increased tension between the workers and the system and here began Ahmed Saada in spreading awareness Worker And political between workers, The role has emerged as one of the Rejectionists to export gas to Israel, On 5 March 2011 he participated in the storming of the State Security building in Nasr City and wrote on one of its walls, leaving his signature:
For the first time celebrating my birthday

Was arrested several times, most recently on 3 October 2011 during its solidarity with the people of Duwaiqa in front of the Council of Ministers, Aggression him By military police and smash his telephone And his camera and then Arrested him But was released quickly under pressure from his colleagues.To be the third time that arrested the Saada after his arrest in 2003 when he was a student during his participation in the student demonstrations against for [the invasion of Iraq, and the second time in 2006 where he was arrested during the distribution of CDs attacking the Egyptian role duringwar on Lebanon .

Newspaper articles Ahmed Saada 
Wrote several newspaper articles and research, including:

See also 
 Alaa Abd El-Fattah
 Wael Khalil
 Youssef Darwish

References

External links 

 Ahmed Saada account on Facebook.
 Ahmed Saada account on Twitter.

Living people
1983 births
Anti-Zionism
Egyptian bloggers
Egyptian socialists
Egyptian democracy activists
Egyptian dissidents
Egyptian human rights activists
Egyptian journalists
Egyptian prisoners and detainees
Egyptian revolutionaries
International Socialist Tendency
People of the Egyptian revolution of 2011
Prisoners and detainees of Egypt
Egyptian torture victims
Egyptian trade unionists